is a Japanese footballer who plays for JEF United Chiba.

Career 
Kawamata joined Ehime FC as an apprentice professional in 2006, while studying at Komatsu High school. He made his J2 League debut against Mito HollyHock in the 41st round. In the 42nd round, he was able to provide an assist for Toshiya Tanaka.

After graduating from high school, he joined Albirex Niigata. In the 2010 season, he moved on a half-year loan to Brazilian club Catanduvense. He made 23 appearances during the 2011 season, scoring his first goal against Nagoya Grampus in the J.League Cup quarterfinals.

In the 2012 season, Kawamata was loaned out to Fagiano Okayama on a season-long loan deal. At the end of the season, after 18 goals in 38 appearances, he returned to Niigata. He made a huge comeback to Albirex scoring 23 goals in 34 matches.

After a great season, Kawamata decided to transfer to Nagoya Grampus at half-season of 2014.

On 29 November 2016, Kawamata moved to Júbilo Iwata. He then moved to JEF United Chiba on 24 June 2020.

Club statistics
Updated to 19 February 2019.

National team statistics

National team goals
Score and Result lists Japan's goal tally first

|-
| 1. || 31 March 2015 || Ajinomoto Stadium, Chōfu, Japan ||  ||  ||  || Friendly || 
|}

References

External links
 Profile at Jubilo Iwata
 
 

1989 births
Living people
People from Saijō, Ehime
Association football people from Ehime Prefecture
Japanese footballers
Japanese expatriate footballers
Japan international footballers
J1 League players
J2 League players
Ehime FC players
Albirex Niigata players
Fagiano Okayama players
Nagoya Grampus players
Júbilo Iwata players
JEF United Chiba players
Expatriate footballers in Brazil
Japanese expatriate sportspeople in Brazil
Association football forwards